The 2002 IFMAR 1:10 Electric Off-Road World Championships was the ninth edition of the IFMAR 1:10 Electric Off-Road World Championship, sanctioned by International Federation of Model Auto Racing. It was meant to be held in 2001. However the event was delayed until 2002 due to the events of September 11 in America. The event was held in Pretoria, South Africa at the Tshwane Raceway and Promotion race facility.

Top 10 - 2WD Results

Top 10 - 4WD Results

External links
Host Clubs Website

Reference

IFMAR 1:10 Electric Off-Road World Championship